Ashika Ranganath is an Indian actress who predominantly appears in Kannada and Telugu language films. She is known for her lead role in the 2016 film Crazy Boy and Raambo 2 (2018).

Early life and personal life 
Ashika was born in a Kannada family to Ranganath and Sudha Ranganath in Hassan district. Her elder sister Anusha Ranganath is also an actress. She studied in Bishop Sargant School, Tumkur and later moved to Bangalore for pre-in Jyoti Nivas College, where she auditioned for a Clean and Clear Fresh Face Bangalore contest, emerging as the runner-up of Miss Fresh Face 2014. She is trained in various dance forms including freestyle, Belly and western. In an interview with ZEE5, Ashika said that she had a crush on actor Siddharth.

Career 
Ashika's career in acting started after Crazy Boy director Mahesh Babu picked her during a Clean and Clear Fresh Face Bangalore contest. She was nominated for the Best Debutant Actress in a Leading Role Award by SIIMA.

Filmography

References

External links
 
 Ashika Ranganath on YouTube
 Ashika Ranganath on Instagram

 

Living people
Kannada actresses
Indian film actresses
21st-century Indian actresses
People from Tumkur
People from Hassan
1996 births